Nikica Cukrov (born 6 March 1954) is a Croatian professional football manager and retired player.

International career
He made his debut for Yugoslavia in a November 1977 Balkan Cup friendly match against Greece, coming on as a 69th-minute substitute for Momčilo Vukotić, and earned a total of 14 caps scoring no goals. His final international was an October 1983 friendly match away against Switzerland.

Personal life
Cukrov was diagnosed with cancer in 2014, which forced him to retire from managing Šibenik. Fortunately he recovered and worked as a scout for football in his county.

References

External links
 
Profile on Yugoslavia national team official site

1954 births
Living people
Sportspeople from Šibenik
Association football midfielders
Yugoslav footballers
Yugoslavia international footballers
Mediterranean Games gold medalists for Yugoslavia
Competitors at the 1979 Mediterranean Games
Mediterranean Games medalists in football
Olympic footballers of Yugoslavia
Footballers at the 1980 Summer Olympics
HNK Šibenik players
HNK Rijeka players
HNK Hajduk Split players
SC Toulon players
Yugoslav First League players
Ligue 1 players
Yugoslav expatriate footballers
Expatriate footballers in France
Yugoslav expatriate sportspeople in France
Croatian football managers
HNK Šibenik managers
NK Zadar managers